The Army Medical Services (AMS) is the organisation responsible for administering the corps that deliver medical, veterinary, dental and nursing services in the British Army. It is headquartered at the former Staff College, Camberley, near the Royal Military Academy Sandhurst.

Role
AMS is responsible for administering the four separate corps that deliver medical, veterinary, dental and nursing services in the British Army. These are:
 Royal Army Medical Corps
 Royal Army Veterinary Corps
 Royal Army Dental Corps
 Queen Alexandra's Royal Army Nursing Corps
AMS contributes to the conservation of fighting strength and morale of the Army and advises commanders on matters of health and disease.

Administration and leadership
The Army Medical Services are administered by Headquarters Army Medical Directorate at Andover, previously under the leadership of the Director General Army Medical Services (DGAMS), formerly Major General Jeremy Rowan.
The Director General answered to the Adjutant-General, and his role was to promote effective medical, dental and veterinary health services for the Army and provide a policy focus for individual medical training, doctrine and force development. The post was disestablished after 2016.

A Freedom of Information request identified that from 2018, "day to day responsibility for medical policy and capability development" would "lie at Brigadier level," but did not indicate the title of that particular post. As of March 2019, a Brigadier is employed within the senior Army ranks as Senior Health Advisor, who "Monitors and assesses the health of the Army to assist Director Personnel in the provision of Health Policy, provides policy oversight and assurance for Commander Field Army in the generation and delivery of medical operational capability, and is directly responsible for the provision of primary care services to the Army and community mental health services to Defence."

List of directors general

Surgeon-General Sir William Alexander Mackinnon (1889–1896)
Surgeon-General Sir William Taylor
Lieutenant-General Sir Alfred Keogh (1905–1910)
Lieutenant-General Sir William Launcelotte Gubbins (1910–?)
Lieutenant-General Sir Arthur Sloggett (1914)
Lieutenant-General Sir Alfred Keogh (1914–1918); second term
Lieutenant-General Sir John Goodwin (1918–1923)
Lieutenant-General Sir William Boog Leishman (1923–1926)
Lieutenant General Sir William MacArthur (1938–1941)
Lieutenant-General Sir Alexander Hood (August 1941–1948)
Lieutenant General Sir Norman Talbot (1969–1973)
Lieutenant-General Sir James Baird (1973–1977)
Lieutenant-General Sir Richard Bradshaw (1977–1981)
Lieutenant General Sir Alan Reay (1981–1984)
Lieutenant General Sir Cameron Moffat (1984–1988) First Surgeon General Defence Medical Services
Major General Anthony Shaw (1988–1990)
Major General (later Lieutenant General) Sir Peter Beale (1990–1993)
Major General Brian Mayes (1993–1996)
Major General Robin Short (1996–1999) 
Major General (later Lieutenant General) Robert Menzies (1999–2000)
Major General David Jolliffe (2000–2003)
Major General (later Lieutenant General) Louis Lillywhite (2003–2004)
Major General Alan Hawley (2005–2009)
Major General Michael von Bertele (2009–2012)
Major General Ewan Carmichael (2012–2014)
Major General Jeremy Rowan (2014–2016)

Master-Generals
Lieutenant General Louis Lillywhite (2017–2022)
Major General Timothy Hodgetts (2022–present)

See also
 First Aid Nursing Yeomanry
 Royal Navy Medical Service
 RAF Medical Services

References

External links
Army Medical Services on the British Army website

British administrative corps
Camberley
Health in Surrey
Medical units and formations of the United Kingdom
Organisations based in Surrey